The Birchmere is a concert hall in Alexandria, Virginia, that features rock, blues, bluegrass, country, folk, jazz, ethnic, and comedic performers. Its main room seats 500 and provides dinner service, making for an intimate space, with tables only a few feet away from the stage. The location also features a bandstand with a bar and a dance floor. Owner and manager Gary Oelze opened The Birchmere in 1966 as a restaurant.

History
The Birchmere opened its doors on April 4, 1966, as a restaurant. Music was added in 1975 with a concert space that held up to 200 people. Its original location was 2723 S. Wakefield St. in the Shirlington area of Arlington, Virginia, in a strip mall that was later razed. On May 14, 1981, the Birchmere reopened at its second location at 3901 Mt. Vernon Avenue in Alexandria, Virginia in a space that held at least 300 persons. In 1997, the club moved two blocks away to its current location at 3701 Mt. Vernon Avenue with seating for 500 customers.

An estimated 13,000 discrete performances have occurred at the music hall.

Over the years, Birchmere has attracted notable customers to include members of the media, Supreme Court justices and Presidents.  

“Bill Clinton came here twice,” Oelze said. “Al Gore used to live up the street and was here all the time. One night he was leaving the White House. Clinton said, ‘Where you going?’ He said, ‘I’m going to The Birchmere to hear Jerry Jeff Walker.’ He said, ‘Hillary and I will go with you.’ The four of them showed up, then they came back to see Kim Richey.”

On November 10, 2021, the illustrated history of the Birchmere was published: All Roads Lead to the Birchmere: America's Legendary Music Hall by Founder/operator Gary Oelze and music writer, Stephen Moore.

On January 23, 2023, Birchmere owner Gary Oelze passed away from natural causes at 80.

Plan for expansion
During the redevelopment of downtown Silver Spring, Maryland, a plan was developed to build a second Birchmere site, slated to be an $8 million, 800-seat venue.  After years of negotiations, the deal was rejected on July 25, 2007.  At the time, Birchmere management claimed that Montgomery County officials breached a contractual agreement with the music venue, but these claims were disputed by the developers and government officials who denied any contractual obligation for development.

Notable concerts and recordings

Concerts 
Ray Charles performed his last concert at the Birchmere on July 20, 2003.

Other important artists who have played the hall include: 

 Aaron Neville 
 Alvin Lee 
 Arlo Guthrie 
 B.B. King 
 Beth Hart
 Blue Oyster Cult 
 Bryan Bowers 
 Buddy Guy 
 Cathy Fink 
 Chris Hillman 
 Cleve Francis 
 Danny Gatton
 Dar Williams 
 Daryl Davis 
 Eddie From Ohio 
 Glen Campbell 
 Graham Nash
 Guy Clark 
 Herb Alpert 
 Janis Ian 
 Joan Baez
 John Prine 
 John Waters 
 Johnny Cash
 Johnny Winter 
 Keiko Matsui 
 Kitty Wells 
 Kris Kristofferson 
 Little Richard 
 Marcy Marxer 
 Mary Chapin Carpenter 
 Marty Stuart
 Merle Haggard 
 Michael Franks 
 Mike Nesmith 
 Shawn Colvin 
 Paula Poundstone 
 Pete and Maura Kennedy 
 Pete Seeger
 Pure Prairie League 
 Ramsey Lewis 
 Richard Thompson 
 Ricky Skaggs 
 Roger Miller 
 Rosanne Cash
 Samantha Fish 
 Stephen Stills 
 Tanya Tucker 
 The Bacon Brothers 
 The Seldom Scene
 The Ventures 
 Tom Paxton 
 Tony Rice 
 Toto 
 Townes Van Zandt 
 Vince Gill

Recordings 

 The Johnson Mountain Boys recorded their Live at the Birchmere album on April 5, 1983. 
 The Four Bitchin' Babes recorded two of their live albums, Buy Me, Bring Me, Take Me, Don't Mess My Hair in 1990 and Gabby Road in 1997, at the Birchmere.  
 Riders in the Sky also recorded their live album there.  Dave Matthews Band recorded songs from their album Recently at the Birchmere on February 21, 1994.

References

Music venues in Virginia
Buildings and structures in Alexandria, Virginia
1966 establishments in Virginia
Event venues established in 1966